Branko Jelić (born 5 May 1977) is a Serbian former professional footballer who played as a striker.

Biography

Club career 
Jelić was born in Čačak. He started his playing career with Borac Čačak before joining Serbian Red Star Belgrade and then FK Vojvodina. He won the Golden Boot Award after scoring 21 goals in the 2005 Chinese Super League season for Beijing Guoan. Branko Jelić scored twice in a 2–0 win for FC Energie Cottbus against Bayern Munich on 15 March 2008.

At national team level, Jelic played for FR Yugoslavia U21 in 1999.

Jelić joined Australian A-League side Perth Glory for the 2009/10 season. He signed in May 2010 following the mutual termination of his contract with his Bundesliga club, agreeing a three-year contract with Jelić. In June 2011, he was released from the final year of his contract having played 33 times for the Glory.

A-League career statistics

Honours
Individual
 Chinese Super League Top Scorer: 2004–2005 with Beijing Guoan – 21 goals

References

1977 births
Living people
Sportspeople from Čačak
Serbs of Bosnia and Herzegovina
Association football forwards
Serbia and Montenegro footballers
Serbia and Montenegro under-21 international footballers
Serbian footballers
FK Borac Čačak players
Red Star Belgrade footballers
FK Vojvodina players
Beijing Guoan F.C. players
Xiamen Blue Lions players
FC Energie Cottbus players
Perth Glory FC players
First League of Serbia and Montenegro players
Bundesliga players
Chinese Super League players
A-League Men players
Serbian expatriate footballers
Expatriate footballers in China
Serbian expatriate sportspeople in China
Expatriate footballers in Germany
Serbian expatriate sportspeople in Germany
Expatriate soccer players in Australia
Serbian expatriate sportspeople in Australia